Anna Kavan (born Helen Emily Woods; 10 April 1901 – 5 December 1968) was a British novelist, short story writer and painter. Originally publishing under her first married name, Helen Ferguson, she adopted the name Anna Kavan in 1939, not only as a pen name but as her legal identity.

Biography

Early life
Anna Kavan was born Helen Emily Woods in Cannes, South of France, the only child of a wealthy British family. Her parents travelled frequently and Kavan grew up in Europe and the United States. As an adult she remembered her childhood as lonely and neglected. Her father died by suicide in 1911. After his death, Kavan returned to the UK where she was a boarder at Parsons Mead School in Ashstead and Malvern College in Worcestershire.

Disregarding her daughter's desire to go to Oxford, her mother arranged an encounter with Donald Ferguson, her mother's former lover. Helen Emily Woods married him in 1920, a few months before he took a position with the Railway Company in Burma. She moved with her husband, began to write and gave birth to her son Bryan. In 1923, Kavan left Ferguson and returned with her son to the UK. These biographical events match the underlying narrative of her initial Bildungsroman Let Me Alone (1930) while Who Are You? (1963), written in a Nouveau Roman style, is an experimental variation of her time in Burma.

Living alone in London during the mid-1920s, she began studying painting at the London Central School of Arts and Crafts, and continued to paint throughout her life. Kavan regularly travelled to the French Riviera where she was introduced to heroin by racing car drivers she took up with. 

In 1928 she divorced Ferguson and married an artist named Stuart Edmonds whom she had met near Toulon. They travelled together through France, Italy, Spain and the Pyrenees before resettling in England. A year later, she published her first novel, A Charmed Circle, under the name Helen Ferguson, followed by five more books over the next eight years.

Kavan and Edmonds had a daughter, Margaret, who died soon after childbirth and they then adopted a child whom they named Susanna. In 1938, when her second marriage ended, she attempted suicide and was admitted to a clinic in Switzerland.  These were the first of what would be multiple hospitalizations and asylum incarcerations throughout Kavan's life for both depression and her lifelong heroin addiction.

As Anna Kavan

Asylum Piece (1940), a collection of short stories which explored the inner mindscape of the psychological explorer, was her first book under the name Anna Kavan, heroine of her previous novels Let Me Alone (1930) and A Stranger Still (1935). All subsequent works would feature a radically altered writing style. From that moment, the brunette Ferguson disappeared and the crystal-blond Kavan set about a career as an avant-garde writer using her legal name in the United States.

An inveterate traveller, Kavan initiated a long journey at the outset of World War II. From September 1939 to February 1943, she spent six months in Carmel-by-the-Sea, California in 1940. The stay inspired her novella, My Soul in China, published posthumously in 1975. She also visited the island of Bali, Indonesia, and stayed for twenty-two months in Napier, New Zealand, her final destination. Her travel itinerary was complicated by the war, which severely restricted many ordinary boat routes. As a consequence, her path took her through New York City three times and the Suez Canal twice.

Returning to England early 1943, she worked briefly with soldiers suffering from war neurosis at the Mill Hill Emergency Hospital and studied for a diploma in Psychological Medicine. She also took a secretarial position at Horizon, an influential literary magazine edited by Cyril Connolly and founded by Peter Watson, one of her friends. She contributed with stories, articles and reviews from 1944 to 1946.

In February 1944, Kavan's son from her first marriage, Bryan Gratney Ferguson, died serving in No. 3 Commando during the Second World War. 

After her return to the UK, Kavan began treatment with the German psychiatrist . He became Kavan's close friend and sometime creative collaborator until his death in 1964. They co-wrote The Horse's Tale (1949) and Kavan dedicated several short stories to her doctor published in the posthumous collection Julia and the Bazooka (1970). There, Kavan received treatment from Ludwig Binswanger, a psychiatrist, pioneer in the field of existential psychology and lifelong friend of Freud.

Kavan continued to undergo sporadic inpatient treatments for heroin addiction and in her later years in London lived as a virtual recluse. She enjoyed a late triumph in 1967 with her novel Ice, inspired by her time in New Zealand and the country's proximity to the inhospitable frozen landscape of Antarctica. The original manuscript was titled The Cold World. When her publisher Peter Owen sent Kavan his initial response, neither rejecting nor accepting her text, he described it as a cross between Kafka and The Avengers. This post-apocalyptic novel brought critical acclaim. It is her best-known novel, still puzzling the reader for its strangeness and nowadays rather introduced as a slipstream novel than a science fiction one.

The first six of her novels gave little indication of the experimental and disturbing nature of her later work published after her detox treatment. Asylum Piece definitely heralded the new style and content of Kavan's writing. Her development of "nocturnal language". involved the lexicon of dreams and addiction, mental instability and alienation. She has been compared to Djuna Barnes, Virginia Woolf, and Sylvia Plath. Brian Aldiss described her as Kafka's sister. Anaïs Nin was an admirer and unsuccessfully pursued a correspondence with Kavan.

Death and legacy

Although popularly supposed to have died of heroin overdose, Kavan died of heart failure at her home in Kensington and was found dead on 5 December 1968. The previous night she had failed to attend a reception in honor of Anaïs Nin at the home of her London-based publisher Peter Owen.

Many of her works were published posthumously, some edited by her friend and legatee, the Welsh writer Rhys Davies. London-based Peter Owen Publishers have been long-serving advocates of Kavan's work and continue to keep her work in print. Doris Lessing, J. G. Ballard, Anaïs Nin, Jean Rhys, Brian Aldiss, Christopher Priest, Nina Allan, Virginia Ironside and Maggie Gee are among the writers who have praised her work.

In 2009 the Anna Kavan Society was founded in London with the aim of encouraging wider readership and increasing academic scholarship of Kavan's work.

Kavan's paintings have been recently exhibited at the Zarrow Art Center in Tulsa, Oklahoma. The Unconventional Anna Kavan: Works on Paper exhibition displayed thirty-six paintings created by Kavan drawn from the McFarlin Library Special Collections, University of Tulsa.  The exhibition Mad, Bad and Sad: Women and the Mind Doctors at Freud Museum London traced key moments in the history of hysteria and counterpointed these with women's inventive art.

Modern scholarship and interpretations
In September 2014, the Anna Kavan Society organized a one-day symposium at the Institute of English Studies in association with Liverpool John Moores University Research Centre for Literature and Cultural History and Peter Owen Publishers. The Anna Kavan Symposium brought together scholars and writers to historicize Kavan's work (from the post-colonial aspects of Kavan's fiction and journalism to the interwar and World War II period), situate her within the literary and intellectual context of her times, and chart her legacy as a writer.

Feminist readings
On Ice and protofeminism, L.Timmel Duchamp said "First published in 1967, on the eve of the second wave of feminism, Ice has never been regarded as a significant work of proto-feminist literature, although scholars occasionally include it on lists of science fiction written by women before the explosion of the genre in the 1970s. The novel's surrealist form demands a different sort of reading than that of science fiction driven by narrative causality, but the text's obsessive insistence on linking the global political violence of the Cold War with the threateningly lethal sexual objectification of Woman and depicting them as two poles of the same suicidal collective will to destroy life makes Ice an interesting feminist literary experiment."

Genre-bending and experimental writing
Kavan's reception as a 'woman writer' has been complicated by her perceived lack of attention to gender politics, and her fiction has most often been interpreted as autobiography rather than experimental and aesthetic writing.

Kavan's work is difficult to situate in fixed literary categories; the scope of her work shows her experimenting with realism, surrealism and absurdism. Her work often abandons linear plot and narrative structure and portrays nameless landscapes and nameless characters. Her disruptive narratives are close to the technique of stream of consciousness associated with modernist novelists. Her best-known novel Ice has been described as slipstream, a non-realistic fiction that crosses conventional genre boundaries, where Borges' Fictions, Calvino's Invisible Cities or Ballard's Crash are cited as 'canon of slipstream writing'.

Politics of madness
Kavan's writing of madness, asylum incarceration and opiate addiction offer a complex and thought-provoking perspective on early twentieth-century psychiatry and psychotherapy. As well as being treated in private asylums and nursing homes, Kavan underwent a short analysis at the Tavistock Clinic, experienced Ludwig Binswanger's method of existential psychotherapy at the Bellevue Sanatorium, and had a close personal relationship with her longtime psychiatrist Karl Bluth. In her fiction and journalism Kavan promoted a radical politics of madness, giving voice to the disenfranchised and marginalized psychiatric patient and presaging the anti-psychiatry movement.

In the exhibition Mad, Bad and Sad: Women and the Mind Doctors at the Freud Museum in London (2013), her work was presented alongside other female explorers of the mind, among them: Mary Lamb, Theroigne de Méricourt, Alice James, Anna O, Ida Bauer, Augustine, Elizabeth Severn, Bryher, Annie Winifred Ellerman, Hilda Doolittle, Princess Marie Bonaparte, Anna Freud, Dorothy Burlingham, Zelda Fitzgerald, Virginia Woolf, Marilyn Monroe and Sylvia Plath.

Influences

Literature
Kavan was friends with the Welsh writer Rhys Davies, who based his 1975 novel Honeysuckle Girl on her early life.

Theater and performance
Choreographer and stage director,  adapted Ice for the theater in 2008.

Silverglass by DJ Britton is a play about the relationship between Rhys Davies and Anna Kavan.  It was presented as a premiere during the Rhys Davies Short Story Conference 2013 held in Swansea. The play is set in the late 1960s and depicts Davies' late literary recognition as well as Kavan's final tragedy.  Both writers lived 'a life of self-invention, in which secrets, sexuality and deep questions of personal identity lurked constantly in the shadows'.

Music and sound art

Thalia Zedek is an American singer and guitarist, active since the early 1980s and member of several notable alternative rock groups, including Live Skull and Uzi. 'Sleep Has His House was the inspiration for the album Sleep Asylum of Uzi' released in 1986.

David Tibet, the primary creative force behind the experimental music/neofolk music group Current 93, named the group's album Sleep Has His House after Anna Kavan's book of the same title.

San Francisco post-rock band Carta titled a song Kavan on their album "The Glass Bottom Boat" after Anna Kavan. The song was subsequently released as a remix by The Declining Winter on their album Haunt the Upper Hallways.

Floriane Pochon, French artist, created a sound artwork untitled Ice Lady based on the novel Ice. It was presented during Les Nuits de la Phaune, a live broadcast event initiated by the Marseille-based  in 2008.

Visual arts
In an installation named Anna, the Wales-based artist duo Heather and Ivan Morison investigate the construction of the self based on ambiguous narratives. They developed an allegorical piece of object theatre draws on the life and works of Kavan using performance and puppetry to connect the objects and play out "a brutal tale of love and loss set against the approaching threat of the ice". It has been first presented in 2012 at The Hepworth Wakefield in Wakefield, England.

Bibliography

As Helen Ferguson
Re-issues after 1939 are under the name Anna Kavan.
 A Charmed Circle (London : Jonathan Cape, 1929, Open Library)
 Let Me Alone (London : Jonathan Cape, 1930, Open Library)
 The Dark Sisters  (London : Jonathan Cape, 1930, Open Library)
 A Stranger Still (London : Jonathan Cape, 1935, Open Library)
 Goose Cross (London : John Lane, 1936, Open Library)
 Rich Get Rich (London : John Lane, 1937, Open Library)

As Anna Kavan
 Asylum Piece  (London : Jonathan Cape, 1940,Open Library)
 Change The Name (London : Jonathan Cape, 1941, Open Library)
 I Am Lazarus (London : Jonathan Cape, 1945, Open Library)
 Sleep Has His House (a.k.a. The House of Sleep (New York : Doubleday, US ed., 1947) – Sleep Has His House (London: Cassel, UK ed., 1948)  Open Library)
 The Horse's Tale (with K. T. Bluth) (London : Gaberbocchus Press, 1949, Open Library)
 A Scarcity of Love (Southport, Lancashire: Angus Downie, 1956, Open Library) 
 Eagle's Nest  (London : Peter Owen, 1957, Open Library) 
 A Bright Green Field and Other Stories  (London : Peter Owen, 1958, Open Library)
 Who Are You? (Lowestoft, Suffolk: Scorpion Press, 1963, Open Library)
 Ice (Peter Owen Publishers, London 1967, scheduled for reissue in Christmas 2017. Open Library)

Published posthumously
 Julia and the Bazooka (London : Peter Owen, 1970)
 My Soul in China (London : Peter Owen, 1975)
 My Madness: Selected Writings (London : Macmillan, 1990)
 Mercury (London : Peter Owen, 1994)
 The Parson (London : Peter Owen, 1995)
 Guilty (London : Peter Owen, 2007)
Machines in the Head: the Selected Short Writing of Anna Kavan (London : Peter Owen, 2019)

Journalism

All work published in Horizon : A Review of Literature and Art

 'New Zealand: Answer to an Inquiry', Horizon 45, Sept 1943
 'The Case of Bill Williams', Horizon 50, Feb 1944
 'Reviews', Horizon 50, Feb 1944
 'Reviews', Horizon 52, April 1944
 'Reviews', Horizon 59, Nov 1944
 'Reviews', Horizon 62, Feb 1945
 'Reviews', Horizon 67, July 1945
 'Reviews', Horizon 73, Jan 1946

Anthologized work by Anna Kavan
 "Department of Slight Confusion." In Book: A Miscellany. No. 3, edited by Leo Bensemann & Denis Glover. Christchurch: Caxton Press, 1941.
 "Ice Storm." In New Zealand New Writing, edited by Ian Gordon. Wellington: Progressive Publishing Society, 1942.
 "I Am Lazarus." Horizon VII, no. 41, 1943, 353–61.
 "New Zealand: An Answer to an Inquiry." Horizon VIII, no. 45, 1943, 153–61.
 "The Big Bang." In Modern Short Stories, edited by Denys Val Baker. London: Staples & Staples, 1943.
 "Face of My People." Horizon IX, no. 53, 1944, 323–35.
 "Face of My People." In Little Reviews Anthology 1945, edited by Denys Val Baker. London: Eyre & Spottiswoode, 1945.
 "I Am Lazarus." In Stories of the Forties Vol. 1, edited by Reginald Moore & Woodrow Wyatt. London: Nicholson & Watson, 1945.
 "Two New Zealand Pieces." In Choice, edited by William Sansom. London: Progressive Publishing, 1946.
 "Brave New Worlds." In Horizon, edited by Cyril Connolly. London, 1946.
 "The Professor." In Horizon, edited by Cyril Connolly. London, 1946.
 "Face of My People." In Modern British Writing, edited by Denys Val Baker. New York: Vanguard Press, 1947.
 "I Am Lazarus." In The World Within: Fiction Illuminating Neuroses of Our Time, edited by Mary Louise W. Aswell. New York: McGraw-Hill Books, 1947.
 "The Red Dogs." In Penguin New Writing, Vol. 37, edited by John Lehmann. Harmondsworth: Penguin, 1949.
 "The Red Dogs." In Pleasures of New Writing: An Anthology of Poems, Stories, and Other Prose Pieces from the Pages of New Writing, edited by John Lehmann. London: John Lehmann, 1952.
 "Happy Name." In London Magazine, edited by Alan Ross. London, 1954.
 "Palace of Sleep." In Stories for the Dead of Night, edited by Don Congdon. New York: Dell Books, 1957
 "A Bright Green Field." In Springtime Two: An Anthology of Current Trends, edited by Peter Owen & Wendy Owen. London: Peter Owen Ltd., 1958.
 "High in the Mountains." In London Magazine, edited by Alan Ross. London, 1958.
 "Five More Days to Countdown."  In Encounter XXXI, no. 1, 1968, 45–49.
 "Julia and the Bazooka." In Encounter XXXII, no. 2, 1969, 16–19.
 "World of Heroes." In Encounter XXXIII, no. 4, 1969, 9–13.
 "The Mercedes." In London Magazine 1970, 17–21.
 "Edge of Panic." In Vogue, 1 October 1971, 75–83.
 "Sleep Has His House" excerpts. In The Tiger Garden: A Book of Writers' Dreams. Foreword by Anthony Stevens. London: Serpent's Tail, 1996
 "The Zebra Struck" In The Vintage Book of Amnesia, edited by Jonathan Lethem. New York: Vintage Books, 2000

Further sources

Biographies

 The Case of Anna Kavan : A Biography, by David Callard. London: Peter Owen, 1994
A Stranger on Earth: The Life and Work of Anna Kavan, by Jeremy Reed.  London: Peter Owen, 2006
 Anna Kavan's New-Zealand, by Jennifer Sturm. Auckland: Random House Books, 2009
 Stranger Still: The Works of Anna Kavan, by Francis Booth. London:Lulu.com, 2013

Major archives
The largest collection of archival material from Kavan is held by the University of Tulsa's McFarlin Library, Department of Special Collections and University Archives. This includes her personal archive of manuscripts and artwork in the Anna Kavan papers, 1867–1991; further material in the Meic Stephens collection of Anna Kavan ephemera, 1943–1971; the Richard R. Centing collection of Anna Kavan, 1943–1991; David A. Callard collection of Anna Kavan; and the Anais Nin papers, 1969–1992.  Other collections beyond Tulsa include The Peter Owen Archives at the Harry Ransom Center, University of Texas with correspondence between Kavan and her publisher Peter Owen and related material. Other archives  contain letters from Kavan to publishers include the William A Bradley Literary Agency, Francis Henry King, Scorpion Press, John Lehmann, Kay Dick and Gerald Hamilton.

Letters from Kavan and papers relating to posthumous publication are included in the Rhys Davis Archive in the National Library of Wales. Letters from Kavan to Walter Ian Hamilton Papers between 1940 and 1955 are in the Alexander Turnbull Library, National Library of New Zealand. Other correspondence can be found at the Jonathan Cape files in the Random House Archives at the University of Reading and the Koestler Archive in Edinburgh University Library, Special Collections.

See also

 Modernism
 Women's Writing
 Autobiographical novel
 Nonlinear narrative

Notes

External links
Anna Kavan Society
Peter Owen Publishers 
Anna Kavan aka Helen Ferguson (redmood.com/kavan) – created by Jan Hanford, archived 2004-12-04
Anna Kavan on Open Library
Anna Kavan by Jennifer Sturm at CulturalIcons.co.uk – discussion by Dr Jennifer Sturm and Debbie Knowles for the Cultural Icons project (audio and video)
 
 
 Anna Kavan papers, 1867-1991, Department of Special Collections and University Archives, McFarlin Library, The University of Tulsa
 Meic Stephens collection of Anna Kavan ephemera, 1943-1971, Department of Special Collections and University Archives, McFarlin Library, The University of Tulsa
 Richard R. Centing collection of Anna Kavan, 1943-1991, Department of Special Collections and University Archives, McFarlin Library, The University of Tulsa
 David A. Callard collection of Anna Kavan, Department of Special Collections and University Archives, McFarlin Library, The University of Tulsa
 Anais Nin papers, 1969-1992, Department of Special Collections and University Archives, McFarlin Library, The University of Tulsa

1901 births
1968 deaths
English short story writers
People educated at Parsons Mead School
British women short story writers
British women novelists
20th-century British women writers
20th-century British novelists
20th-century British short story writers
British expatriates in France